857 Naval Air Squadron was a squadron of the Royal Navy Fleet Air Arm. It was first formed on 1 April 1944 at Squantum NAS in the United States as a torpedo reconnaissance unit with Grumman Avenger IIs. It reformed in its present state on 13 December 2006, when 849 Naval Air Squadron B Flight recommissioned as 857 Naval Air Squadron.

World War II 
After the squadrons formation, it returned to the UK in June 1944 and re-trained as an anti-submarine unit. The squadron attacked targets throughout Sumatra, the East China Sea and Formosa before sailing to Hong Kong on 1 September 1945.

The squadron moved to Australia post war, leaving its aircraft at HMAS Albatross, when it returned to the UK to disband on 20 November 1945.

Reformation 
The unit reformed with the Westland Sea King ASaC.7 on 13 December 2006 at RNAS Culdrose, from 849 Squadron, B Flight. Its first tour of duty was on board RFA Fort Austin for a five-month deployment to the Middle East and the Horn of Africa, with aims of denying the passage of the seas to Al Qaeda, pirates, traffickers and smugglers. The squadron then headed to NAS Norfolk in Virginia, United States, for exercises with United States Navy fighter planes and carrier battle groups.

857 NAS returned to the Middle East in the first half of 2008, replacing its sister squadron 854 NAS on Operation Calash. It returned to carrying out maritime security operations. The squadron carried out operations in the North Sea on board HMS Illustrious, testing airborne early warning capabilities.

In 2011, several of the Sea Kings were stated to be part of the Response Force Task Group.

Future
857 NAS will be decommissioned in the new year of 2015 and merge with its parent unit to form "Palembang Flight".

External links
Main Webpage

References
Notes

Bibliography

Sturtivant and Ballance (1994), The Squadrons of the Fleet Air Arm, Air Britain Publications, 480pp, .

857
Military units and formations established in 1944
Military of the United Kingdom in Cornwall